Rejterówka  is a village in the administrative district of Gmina Łubnice, within Staszów County, Świętokrzyskie Voivodeship, in south-central Poland.

The village has a population of 108.

Demography 
According to the 2002 Poland census, there were 108 people residing in Rejterówka village, of whom 51.9% were male and 48.1% were female. In the village, the population was spread out, with 23.1% under the age of 18, 30.6% from 18 to 44, 20.4% from 45 to 64, and 25.9% who were 65 years of age or older.
 Figure 1. Population pyramid of village in 2002 — by age group and sex

References

Villages in Staszów County